Thierry Mukuta Kiesse (born 5 January 1989 in Paris) is a Congolese footballer who currently plays as a defensive midfielder in FK Valmiera.

Club career
Mukuta Kiesse started his playing career in 2005 with French club SCO Angers B where he became a reference. In 2009, he moved to German division Spandauer SV club in the Regionalliga Berlin 1 where he played 36 games and scoring 6 goals. The defensive midfielder was recruited in 3.Liga SV Wacker Burghausen club, in 2010, where he was trained by the famous Mario Basler. In 2011, Mukuta Kiesse decided to return in France to join the Ligue 2 US Orléans club for a season where he appeared in 49 of their matches and scoring 8 goals. Mukuta Kiesse joined the Ligue 1 Algerian RC Arbaa club in 2014.

International career
Thierry Mukuta made three appearances for the Democratic Republic of the Congo under-21 and was also invited to the senior national team in 2015 by coach Florent Ibengé where he also made three appearances for the national team.

References

External links
 

1989 births
Living people
Democratic Republic of the Congo international footballers
Democratic Republic of the Congo footballers
French footballers
Association football midfielders
Valmieras FK players